The Norfolk Women's cricket team is the women's representative cricket team for the English historic county of Norfolk. They play their home games at various grounds across the county, and are captained by Ellie Stanley. In 2019, they played in Division Three of the final season of the Women's County Championship, and have since competed in the Women's Twenty20 Cup. They are partnered with the regional side Sunrisers.

History
Norfolk Women joined the national women's cricket structure in 2002, as part of the Emerging Counties division: in their first season they played two games, winning one and losing one. The topped the Emerging Counties league in 2003, and joined the County Challenge Cup in 2004.  Norfolk have consistently played in the lower levels of the Women's County Championship, although they did gain promotions in 2008 and 2015. In recent years, they have played in Division 3 of the Championship.

Norfolk have performed similarly in the Women's Twenty20 Cup, having always played in the bottom tier of the competition since 2010. Their most successful season was in 2017, when they won five of their eight games. In 2020, after the cancellation of the planned season due to the COVID-19 pandemic, Norfolk competed in the East of England Championship. In 2021, they competed in the East Group of the Twenty20 Cup, but finished bottom with no wins, as well as finishing 5th in the East of England Championship. They again finished bottom of their group in the 2022 Women's Twenty20 Cup, and finished sixth out of seven in the East of England Championship.

Players

Current squad
Based on appearances in the 2022 season.

Seasons

Women's County Championship

Women's Twenty20 Cup

See also
 Norfolk County Cricket Club
 Sunrisers (women's cricket)

References

Cricket in Norfolk
Women's cricket teams in England